The Indian National Congress (U) was a breakaway faction of the Indira Gandhi-led Congress (I), formed in July 1979 by D. Devaraj Urs, the then Chief Minister of Karnataka. Urs' explanation of the split was the return of Indira's son Sanjay Gandhi into the party fold. Urs took with him many legislators from Karnataka, Kerala, Maharashtra and Goa including future Union Ministers and Chief Ministers, Yashwantrao Chavan, Dev Kant Baruah, Kasu Brahmananda Reddy, A.K. Antony, Sharad Pawar, Sarat Chandra Sinha, Priyaranjan Das Munshi and K. P. Unnikrishnan.

Subsequently, Devaraj Urs joined Janata Party; Yashwantrao Chavan, Brahmananda Reddy, and Chidambaram Subramaniam joined Congress (Indira); and A. K. Antony split from Congress (U) to form Congress (A) in Kerala. When Sharad Pawar took over the party presidency in October 1981, the name of the party was changed to Indian Congress (Socialist).

Leaders 

 Devaraj Urs
 Yashwantrao Chavan
 Jagjivan Ram
 Kasu Brahmananda Reddy
 Dev Kant Baruah
 Vasantdada Patil
 Sharad Pawar
 Swaran Singh
 Chidambaram Subramaniam
 Siddhartha Shankar Ray
 Moulvi Fakhrey Alam
 Sarat Chandra Sinha
 Vayalar Ravi
 Karan Singh
 Priyaranjan Das Munshi
 Ambika Soni
 Oommen Chandy
 P. C. Chacko
 K.P. Unnikrishnan
 P. J. Kurien
 A. C. Shanmughadas
 K. C. Pant

See also 
Indian National Congress breakaway parties

References

 
Defunct political parties in India
Political parties established in 1978
1978 establishments in India
Political parties disestablished in 1981
1981 disestablishments in India